Walter Gresham (July 22, 1841 – November 6, 1920) was a U.S. Representative from Texas.

Biography
Born at "Woodlawn," near Newtown, King and Queen County, Virginia, Gresham attended Stevensville Academy and Edge Hill Academy, and graduated from the University of Virginia at Charlottesville in 1863. He served as a private in the Confederate States Army during the Civil War. He studied law, and was admitted to the bar in 1867 and commenced practice in Galveston, Texas. He served as district attorney for the Galveston judicial district in 1872. He served as a member of the Texas House of Representatives 1886-1891.

Gresham was elected as a Democrat to the Fifty-third Congress (March 4, 1893 – March 3, 1895).
He was an unsuccessful candidate for reelection in 1894 to the Fifty-fourth Congress, and resumed the practice of law in Galveston, Texas. He died in Washington, D.C., on November 6, 1920, and was interred in Lakeview Cemetery, Galveston, Texas.

He built and resided in the stately Bishop's Palace in Galveston.

References
 Retrieved on 2009-04-29

1841 births
1920 deaths
Confederate States Army soldiers
University of Virginia alumni
Texas lawyers
People from Galveston, Texas
People from King and Queen County, Virginia
Democratic Party members of the Texas House of Representatives
Democratic Party members of the United States House of Representatives from Texas
19th-century American lawyers